Thal Nature Park (Naturpark Thal in German) is a nature reserve located in the Swiss Canton of Solothurn, bordering the cantons of Bern and Basel-Landschaft. The largest municipality in Thal Nature Park is Balsthal. It features the wide valley of the river Dünnern behind the Weissenstein mountain range. In 2012, the FOEN deemed the reserve a "park of national importance," a label that is effective for ten years from its instatement on January 1, 2010.

Fortress ruins point to its former history as a pack route through the small town of Klus, however, today the surrounding land serves mostly agricultural purposes.

The "Haar und Kamm" (hair and comb) Museum, a former comb factory, is also located in the park.

See also 
 Nature parks in Switzerland

References

External links 

Naturpark Thal, official website
Thal Nature Park, MySwitzerland.com

Nature reserves in Switzerland
Solothurn